Not Everybody's Lucky Enough to Have Communist Parents or Tout le monde n'a pas eu la chance d'avoir des parents communistes is a 1993 French comedy film directed by Jean-Jacques Zilbermann and starring Josiane Balasko. She received her second nomination to the César Award for Best Actress for this role.

Plot 

In 1958 open referendum for the adoption of the Constitution of the Fifth French Republic, the daily life of Irene, communist activist who was rescued from concentration camps by the Red Army when she was young, and who is married to Bernard small Gaullist shopkeeper. Their political differences undermine their couple, watched their son and brother of Irene that often comes with her sister. In this historical moment, the Alexandrov Ensemble come to give a representation in France, allowing Irene to meet veterans of the Battle of Stalingrad in the sight jealous of her husband. She will do anything to convince him to vote no in the referendum ...

Cast 
 Josiane Balasko as Irène
 Maurice Bénichou as Bernard
 Catherine Hiegel as Régine
 Jean-François Dérec as Uncle Charlot
 Viktor Neznanov as Ivan
 Aleksandr Piskaryov as Boris
 Aleksey Maslov as Sacha
 Jérémy Davis as Little Leon
 Christine Dejoux as Jeannette
 Jacques Herlin as Choumerski
 André Oumansky as Cousin Isaac

References

External links

1993 films
1993 comedy films
French comedy films
1990s French-language films
Films directed by Jean-Jacques Zilbermann
1990s French films